Ime is a village in Lindesnes municipality in Agder county, Norway. The village is located on the east side of the river Mandalselva, along the European route E39 highway. Ime is an eastern suburb of the town of Mandal. Ime might be considered to be a "commuter town" with its residents living here, but working in Mandal. There is a school in Ime.

References

Villages in Agder
Lindesnes